Macambira River may refer to two rivers in Brazil:

 Macambira River (Ceará)
 Macambira River (Goiás)

See also 
 Macambira